The American dramatic television series Touched by an Angel premiered on CBS on September 21, 1994 and ran for nine seasons until its conclusion on April 27, 2003. Its 211 episodes chronicled the cases of two angels, Monica (Roma Downey) and her supervisor Tess (Della Reese), who bring messages from God to various people to help them as they reach a crossroads in their lives. In the second season, the character Andrew (John Dye), was introduced as the angel of death, and in the last two seasons, a new trainee, Gloria (Valerie Bertinelli) is added to the regular cast.

Created by John Masius and produced by Martha Williamson, the series eventually became one of CBS highest-rated series during its third through six seasons, peaking at the sixth highest rated show during its fourth season. Ratings dropped significantly in the eighth season after it was moved from Sunday to Saturday. The episodes use one opening theme, "Walk with You", a song performed by Reese.

Series overview

Episodes

Season 1 (1994–95)

Season 2 (1995–96)

Season 3 (1996–97)

Season 4 (1997–98)

Season 5 (1998–99)

Season 6 (1999–2000)

Season 7 (2000–01)

Season 8 (2001–02)

Season 9 (2002–03)

References

See also
List of Promised Land episodes

External links
 
 
  

E
Lists of American drama television series episodes